This is a list of King George's Fields in England, split by county.

 Bedfordshire
 Berkshire

 Buckinghamshire
 Cambridgeshire
 Cheshire
 Cornwall
 Cumbria
 Derbyshire
 Devon
 Dorset
 Durham
 East Riding of Yorkshire
 East Sussex
 Essex
 Gloucestershire
 Greater London
 Greater Manchester
 Hampshire
 Herefordshire
 Hertfordshire

 Kent
 Lancashire
 Leicestershire
 Lincolnshire

 Merseyside
 Norfolk
 North Yorkshire
 Northamptonshire
 Northumberland
 Nottinghamshire
 Oxfordshire
 Rutland
 Shropshire
 Somerset
 South Yorkshire
 Staffordshire
 Suffolk
 Surrey
 Tyne and Wear
 Warwickshire
 West Midlands 
 West Sussex
 West Yorkshire
 Wiltshire
 Worcestershire

Monuments and memorials in England
England